General elections were held in Guatemala on 5 March 1978. No candidate received more than 50% of the vote in the presidential election, resulting in Fernando Romeo Lucas García being elected president by Congress with 35 votes, amidst an opposition boycott. The Congressional elections were won by the National Liberation Movement.

Results

President

Congress

References

Bibliography
Villagrán Kramer, Francisco. Biografía política de Guatemala: años de guerra y años de paz. FLACSO-Guatemala, 2004. 
Political handbook of the world 1978. New York, 1979.

Elections in Guatemala
1978 in Guatemala
Guatemala
Presidential elections in Guatemala
Election and referendum articles with incomplete results